Marra is a surname, and may refer to:

 Ada Marra (born 1973), Swiss politician
 Adelia Marra (born 1979), Italian speed skater
 Andrea Marra (born 1985), Korean American politician and human rights activist 
 Anthony Marra (born 1984), American fiction writer
 Benjamin Marra (born 1977), American illustrator and comic-book artist 
 Giovanni Marra (1931-2018), Roman Catholic Bishop of Usula
 Grace Marra (born 1959), American musician
 Harry Marra (born 1947),  American track and field coach
 Ivna Marra (born 1990), Brazilian female volleyball player
 Jenny Marra (born 1977), Scottish Labour Party politician
 Joe Marra (born 1987), American professional lacrosse player
 Kenneth Marra (born 1951), United States District Judge of the United States District Court for the Southern District of Florida
 Marco Marra (born 1966), Canadian scientist
 Michael Marra (1952–2012), Scottish singer-songwriter and musician
 Placido della Marra (1560–1620), Italian Roman Catholic prelate, Bishop of Melfi e Rapolla 
 Ralph J. Marra Jr. (born c. 1953), American lawyer
 Victor Marra Newland (1876–1953), Australian army officer and politician
 Vincenzo della Marra (1645–1712), Italian Roman Catholic prelate, Bishop of Alessano
 Vincenzo Marra (born 1972), Italian filmmaker
 William A. Marra (1928–1998), candidate for President of the United States in the 1988